Niall mac Fergal Óge Ó hUicinn, Irish poet, died 1461.

The Annals of Connacht sub anno 1461 note the death of a number of Irish poets, including Niall:

 O Dalaig of Corcomroe, Niall Oc O hUicinn and Niall son of Fergal Oc O hUicinn died.

His sister, Elec Ní hUicinn, was murdered at her home in 1471, while his brother Sean mac Fergail Óicc Ó hÚigínn, died as Chief Ollamh of Ireland in poetry in 1490.

External links
 http://www.ucc.ie/celt/published/T100011/index.html

15th-century Irish poets
Medieval Irish poets
People from County Mayo
1461 deaths
Year of birth unknown
Irish male poets